Donald Hood Keefer (August 18, 1916 – September 7, 2014) was an American actor known for his versatility in performing comedic, as well as highly dramatic, roles.  In an acting career that spanned more than 50 years, he appeared in hundreds of stage, film, and television productions.  He was a founding member of The Actors Studio, and he performed in both the original Broadway play and 1951 film versions of Arthur Miller's Death of a Salesman. His longest-lasting roles on television were in 10 episodes each of Gunsmoke and Angel.

Early life and career
Born in Highspire, Pennsylvania in August 1916, Donald Keefer was the youngest of three sons of Edna (née Hood) and John E. Keefer, who worked as a butcher.  When he was in his early twenties, "Don" moved to New York City, where he attended the American Academy of Dramatic Arts, graduating from that prestigious acting school in 1939.  That same year, at the New York World's Fair, he performed various roles on stage in excerpts of works by William Shakespeare.  During the 1940s, Keefer found work as supporting characters in Broadway plays such as Junior Miss and Othello.  He also began studying method acting in Manhattan as an early member of The Actors Studio.  In this period, he gained some early experience and performed in the new medium of television.  In 1947, Keefer appeared in a televised presentation of Shakespeare's play Twelfth Night and in an episode of the anthology series Kraft Television Theatre.  The next year, he performed again on Kraft Theatre in an episode titled "The Silver Cord".

By 1949, Keefer was back on Broadway as a cast member in the acclaimed production of Arthur Miller's play Death of a Salesman, directed by Elia Kazan. Keefer's exposure in that play led to his first movie role, reprising his performance as Bernard in the 1951 film version of Death of a Salesman.  He soon appeared in other films, including The Girl in White (1952), The Caine Mutiny (1954), Six Bridges to Cross (1955), Away All Boats (1956), and Hellcats of the Navy (1957). Increasingly, however, Keefer in the 1950s began focusing on performing on the "small screen", accepting more roles in a wide variety of television series.

Later films and television
Keefer appeared in dozens of television series, including other early anthologies: Fireside Theatre, Armstrong Circle Theatre, The Philco Television Playhouse, the United States Steel Hour, Alcoa Presents: One Step Beyond, The DuPont Show with June Allyson, Gunsmoke, and Death Valley Days. In 1957, Keefer appeared as McNair in the episode "Ito of Attu" on ABC Navy Log. That same year, he appeared with David Janssen as the character Reagan in "Big Score" of the CBS series Richard Diamond, Private Detective. In 1958, he appeared as Ed Locke in the episode "Wild Green Yonder" of the syndicated crime drama State Trooper, starring Rod Cameron. In 1959, Keefer appeared as John Alastair in the episode "Death Is a Red Rose" of the Craig Stevens NBC crime drama Peter Gunn. Keefer performed in three episodes of CBS's anthology Alfred Hitchcock Presents:  in the role of Dr. Elkins in "The Indestructible Mr. Weems" (1957), as Pete Williams in "The Percentage" (1958), and as a tax clerk in "The Kiss-Off" (1961). He also had small roles in some feature films, including Woody Allen's Sleeper.  In 1966, he played the character Irving Christiansen in the movie The Russians Are Coming, the Russians Are Coming.He also had a small role in Rod Serling’s Twilight Zone prequel “Time Element” in 1958, starring William Benedix, Darryl Hickman and Martin Balsam.

Personal life
On May 7, 1950, Keefer married the actress Catherine McLeod, and the couple remained married for 47 years, until her death on May 11, 1997.

In 1957, Don played husband to Catherine on an episode of Gunsmoke titled “Wrong Man”(S2E29), his character being a homesteader turned cowardly killer and abusive husband who she finally leaves.

At the time of Catherine's death (following his retirement in acting), the Keefers were living in Sherman Oaks in the San Fernando Valley of Los Angeles County, California. The three Keefer sons are Donald McLeod, John H., and Thomas James. Don Keefer died at the age of 98 on September 7, 2014.

Films roles

Death of a Salesman (1951) - Bernard
The Girl in White (1952) - Dr. Williams
Riot in Cell Block 11 (1954) - Reporter
The Caine Mutiny (1954) - Court Stenographer - Yeoman 1st Class (uncredited)
The Human Jungle (1954) - Det. Cleary
Six Bridges to Cross (1955) - Sherman
An Annapolis Story (1955) - Air Officer (uncredited)
Away All Boats (1956) - Ens. Twitchell
Hellcats of the Navy (1957) - Jug
Torpedo Run (1958) - Ens. Ron Milligan
Cash McCall (1960) - Junior Partner (uncredited)
The Clown and the Kid (1961) - Moko
Incident in an Alley (1962) - Roy Swanson
The Last of the Secret Agents? (1966) - Over-Vain Spy (uncredited)
The Russians Are Coming, the Russians Are Coming (1966) - Irving Christiansen
Butch Cassidy and the Sundance Kid (1969) - Fireman
Gaily, Gaily (1969) - (uncredited)
R.P.M. (1970) - Dean George Cooper
Rabbit, Run (1970) - Mr. Springer
The Grissom Gang (1971) - Doc Grissom
Walking Tall (1973) - Dr. Lamar Stivers
The Young Nurses (1973) - Chemist
Ace Eli and Rodger of the Skies (1973) - Mr. Parsons
The Way We Were (1973)
Sleeper (1973) - Doctor Tryon
Candy Stripe Nurses (1974) - Dr. Wilson
Billy Jack Goes to Washington (1977) - Bailey Associate
The Car (1977) - Dr. Pullbrook
Fire Sale (1977) - Banker
Mirrors (1978) - Peter
The Kid from Not-So-Big (1978) - Hank 'Gramps' Goodman
The Last Word (1979) - Mayor Wenzel
Creepshow (1982) - Mike the Janitor (segment "The Crate")
The Marrying Man (1991) - Justice #3
Lucy & Desi: Before the Laughter (1991) - Grandpa Ball
Liar Liar (1997) - Beggar at Courthouse (final film role)

Western roles
Keefer's Gunsmoke appearances included three half-hour episodes and seven full one-hour broadcasts that aired from 1957-1973

"Wrong Man" (13 April 1957) - as the character Sam Rickers
"Bad Sheriff" (7 January 1961) - Chet
"Coventry" (17 March 1962) - Rankin
"Quint-Cident" (27 April 1963) - Nally
"The Pariah" (17 April 1965) - Newspaper editor
"Taps for Old Jeb" (16 October 1965) - Milty Sims
"Champion of the World" (24 December 1966) - Wally
"Gentry's Law" (12 October 1970) - Floyd Babcock
"Waste: Part 1" (27 September 1971) - Drunk
"Kitty's Love Affair" (22 October 1973) - Turner

Keefer appeared in more than a dozen other western series

Gunsmoke as Sam (robber) in Bad Sheriff" (CBS, 1960)
Wagon Train in "The Tom Tuckett Story" (NBC, 1960)
Hotel de Paree as Red Porterfield in "Sundance and the Barren Soil" (CBS, 1960)
Rawhide as Hames in "Incident of the Druid Curse" (CBS, 1960)
Have Gun - Will Travel, three episodes (CBS, 1957–1960)
Whispering Smith as Dr. Johnson in "The Deadliest Weapon" (NBC, 1961)
The Dakotas as a minister in "Feud at Snake River" (ABC, 1963)
Death Valley Days as a military officer in "The Hero of Apache Pass" (Syndicated, 1966)
Dundee and the Culhane as Johnson in "The Dead Man's Brief" (CBS, 1967)
Walt Disney's Wonderful World of Color as John Prentice in two episodes of the Gallegher miniseries. Roger Mobley played the part of Gallegher. (NBC, 1967)
The Iron Horse as Blake in "Sister Death" (ABC, 1967)
The Outcasts in "The Man from Bennington" (ABC, 1968)
Cimarron Strip as Bolt in "The Judgment" (CBS, 1968)
The Guns of Will Sonnett in two episodes (ABC, 1968–1969)
The Virginian in three episodes (NBC, 1966–1969)
The High Chaparral as a telegrapher in "Spokes" (NBC, 1970)
Alias Smith and Jones as Dr. Hiram Wilson in "The Man Who Murdered Himself" (ABC, 1971)
Nichols in "The Specialists" (NBC, 1971)
Bonanza as Billy Harris in "The Running Man" and as Tobias Temple in "The Rattlesnake Brigade" (NBC, 1971)
Kung Fu in two episodes (ABC, 1974 and 1975)

Angel and other comedies
On Angel, Keefer portrayed the neighbor "George", husband of "Susie", a character played by Doris Singleton, a veteran of the original I Love Lucy series. Marshall Thompson (1925–1992) played Johnny Smith, a young architect and the husband of Fargé's Angel Smith character. Keefer's Angel roles include:

"Goodbye Young Lovers"
"Voting Can Be Fun" (13 October 1960)
"Angel's Temper" (10 November 1960)
"The Valedictorian" (15 December 1960)
"The Dowry" (19 January 1961)
"The Joint Bank Account" (2 February 1961)
"Call Me Mother" (9 February 1961)
"Phone Fun" (22 March 1961)
"Unpopular Mechanics" (19 April 1961)
"The Trailer" (10 May 1961)

The following are a selection of other sitcoms in which Keefer performed

Window on Main Street in "Girl with the Rose Colored Eyes" (CBS, 1962)
Car 54, Where Are You? as Dr. R.L. Mitchell, psychiatrist, in "Remember St. Petersburg" (1962) 
The Real McCoys as Harry Porter in "The Peacemakers" (CBS, 1963)
My Favorite Martian, two episodes (CBS, 1964)
The Munsters (CBS, 1965)
The Jack Benny Program (NBC, 1965)
The Farmer's Daughter (ABC, 1966)
Petticoat Junction (CBS, 1966)
The Russians Are Coming, the Russians Are Coming as Irving Christiansen (film, 1966)
Bewitched (ABC, 1966)
That Girl (ABC, 1966)
Love on a Rooftop in "My Father, the TV Star" (ABC, 1967)
The Andy Griffith Show, two episodes (CBS, 1967 and 1968)
The Good Guys (CBS, 1969)
Green Acres (CBS, 1970)
Alice (CBS, 1984)
Lucy and Desi: Before the Laughter as Grandfather Ball in television movie (CBS, 1991)

Dramatic episodes
Keefer appeared as Cromwell in the 1968 episode "Assignment: Earth" of the NBC science fiction series Star Trek.  Earlier, he had roles in the following three episodes of CBS's The Twilight Zone: as Dan Hollis in "It's a Good Life" (1961), as Spiereto in "Passage on the Lady Anne" (1963), and as Fred Danziger in "From Agnes - With Love" (1964).

His other drama roles include

Appointment with Adventure ("The Royal Treatment" episode of the CBS anthology series, 1955)
Richard Diamond, Private Detective, as Reagan in "The Big Score" (1957) 
Going My Way, as Mr. Ewbank in "One Small Unhappy Family" (ABC, 1963)
The Fugitive as Ben Haddock in "Where the Action Is" (ABC, 1964)
Slattery's People as George Farnum in "Question: What Did You Do All Day, Mr. Slattery? (CBS, 1965)
Mission: Impossible as Zubin in "The Trial" (CBS, 1967)
Felony Squad as Harry Jocelyn in "A Most Proper Killing" (ABC, 1967)
The F.B.I., four episodes (ABC, 1966–1971)
Chase in "Vacation for a President" (NBC, 1974)
Marcus Welby, M.D. as Dr. Marvin in "Don't Talk About Darkness" (1972) and as Larry Sabberly in "The Mugging" (ABC, 1974)
S.W.A.T. as Captain Wallen in "Terror Ship" (ABC, 1975)
The Streets of San Francisco as Dr. Mayhill in "Clown of Death" (ABC, 1976)
The Waltons as Arnie Shimerdy in "The Go-Getter" (CBS, 1977)
Barnaby Jones as Mr. Greening in "Programmed for Killing" (1974), as Dave Blevins in "Silent Vendetta" (1976), as Professor Albertson in "The Killer on Campus" (1977), and Tully Kupper in "Target for a Wedding" (CBS, 1979)
Quincy, M.E., three episodes (NBC, 1979–1982)
Highway to Heaven as Dr. Washburn in "For the Love of Larry" (NBC, 1986)
All My Children as Horace Willoughby (ABC, 1986)
Picket Fences as Billy Shauger in "The Snake Lady" (1992) and "Heart of Saturday Night" (CBS, 1995)
Lois & Clark: The New Adventures of Superman as Old Benny Rockland in "Brutal Youth" (ABC, 1996),

Keefer's last role was as a beggar at a courthouse in the 1997 film Liar Liar.

References

External links
 
 

1916 births
2014 deaths
20th-century American male actors
Actors from Harrisburg, Pennsylvania
American male film actors
American male television actors
Male actors from Greater Los Angeles
People from Sherman Oaks, Los Angeles